The two Big Savage Mountain (Maryland and Pennsylvania) summits are part of Savage Mountain. The peak of Big Savage Mountain in Maryland is High Rock, at 2986 feet.

References 

Landforms of Allegany County, Maryland
Allegheny Mountains
Mountains of Maryland
Mountains of Pennsylvania
Landforms of Garrett County, Maryland
Landforms of Somerset County, Pennsylvania